Ghetto Blues is the debut studio album by rapper Marvaless, released on June 30, 1994.  It peaked at number 100 on the Billboard Top R&B/Hip-Hop Albums.

Track listing 
 "Ghetto Blues" — 4:48
 "Niggas & Hoes" (featuring Tucker) — 5:01
 "Smokin' Da Bomb" (featuring C-Bo, Rup Dog, & Thomas) — 5:07
 "It's About Time" — 3:23
 "Kill the Disrespect" — 3:48
 "Can't Stand the Heat" (featuring C-Bo & Thomas) — 5:25
 "Don't Cross Me" — 4:22
 "Another Dead Nigga" — 3:32
 "Female Assassin" — 4:49
 "Shouts Out" — 5:54

Personnel 
 C-Bo – Composer
 DJ Daryl – Producer
 Big Hollis - Producer
 Keba Konte – Photography
 Marvaless – Composer
 Rup Dog – Composer
 Xtra Large – Producer

References

External links 
 Ghetto Blues at Discogs
 Ghetto Blues at CD Universe
 Ghetto Blues at iTunes

1994 albums
Albums produced by Big Hollis
Marvaless albums
Gangsta rap albums by American artists